Viktor Viktorovich Tsyganov (– 25 June 1944) was a lieutenant general of the Red Army during the Second World War.

Biography
During the First World War, Tsyganov served as a lieutenant of cavalry in the Russian Imperial Army. In 1918 he joined the Red Army, and ended his service in the Civil War as the chief of staff of a shock (cavalry) brigade in Belorussia. During the interwar years, apart from having command of a rifle regiment in 1934, he served exclusively in staff and instruction roles, making him an unlikely choice for high-level field command in wartime. During these years he served in the Western and Belorussian Military Districts, and in 1933 he graduated from the Frunze Academy. Following this, his regimental command, and his service as chief of staff of a rifle division later in 1934, he went on to instructional assignments, as assistant commandant of the Tambov Military School, then at the Military Economics Academy, moving to the head of the tactics department of that institution in 1939. On 2 April 1940, he was promoted to the rank of Kombrig, and on 4 June this rank was converted to that of Major General.

After the German invasion began in June 1941, Tsyganov served as deputy chief of staff of the Southwestern Main Direction's rear services in August and September, before taking command of 38th Army during its unsuccessful defense of Kharkov in late September and October. However, after his army helped halt the German advance in November, in the following month the STAVKA appointed him to command of Southern Front's 56th Army, which participated in that Front's successful winter counteroffensives. After assisting in driving 1st Panzer Army out of Rostov-on-Don in early December and back to the Mius River, 56th Army spent the rest of the winter and spring of 1942 on the southernmost sector of Southern Front, right down to the coast of the Sea of Azov. At the start of the German summer offensive the Army consisted of two rifle brigades and three rifle divisions in the first echelon, backed by two more rifle brigades and a tank brigade with 55 tanks, plus two fortified regions manning fixed defenses in and around Rostov.

1st Panzer and 17th Armies began their attack on 7 July and by the 16th the Front commander, Lt. Gen. Rodion Malinovsky, was authorized by the STAVKA to order his armies to begin an orderly withdrawal to the Don River south of Rostov over five nights, protected by strong rearguards. Late on the 20th, LVII Panzer Corps had crossed the Mius and was driving the rearguards of 56th Army back towards the city. In the following days Tsyganov ordered his forces to defend Rostov by manning the outer and inner defensive belts on the northern and eastern sectors. These plans were undone by the rapid advance of the German tank forces and the premature withdrawal of 18th Army south of the Don. 56th Army was forced to withdraw as well, and after a bitter defense mainly by NKVD security troops Rostov-on-Don fell to the Germans for the second time on 27 July. Deemed by Stalin to be unfit for field command, Tsyganov was relieved a few days later.

Tsyganov was immediately reassigned to become deputy commander in chief for military schools in the Moscow Military District. On 16 October 1943, he was promoted to the rank of lieutenant general. He was still serving in the training establishment when he died of illness on 25 June 1944, at the age of 47.

References

External links
Lt. Gen. V.V. Tsyganov at Generals.dk
Tsyganov on Russian Wikipedia

1896 births
1944 deaths
Soviet lieutenant generals
Soviet military personnel of World War II
Recipients of the Order of the Red Banner